Facta is an encyclopedia in Finnish. It was published as a series of 11 volumes with more than 150,000 entries between 1969 and 1974. It describes subjects from a Finnish point of view. It was run by editors in chief Veli Valpola and Maija Numminen and published by Tietosanakirja Oy. Editions were eventually also published on CD-ROM, and Facta finally lived as an Internet service, but was discontinued at the end of 2011 as unprofitable.

References

Finnish-language encyclopedias
1969 books
20th-century encyclopedias